HMS Teazer was a T-class destroyer of the Royal Navy that saw service during the Second World War. She was later converted to a Type 16 fast anti-submarine frigate, with the new pennant number F23.

Service history

Wartime service
During September 1943, Teazer underwent builder's trials before being commissioned. Upon commissioning, she was accepted into the 24th Destroyer Flotilla. Upon deployment with the flotilla, Teazer underwent working up exercises in Scapa Flow before sailing for the Mediterranean theatre, where, in November, she supported ground operations by the British X Corps in the Minturno sector.

In July 1944, she was placed under U.S Navy command and was one of the ships scheduled to support the landing in the South of France as part of Operation Dragoon.

During the Allied withdrawal form the Aegean Sea in 1944, Teazer was responsible for the sinking of the transport ship KT Erpel and the submarine chaser UJ2171 off Cape Spatha.

In May 1945, following a refit in January and February, she was assigned to Task Force 57 and then Task Force 37 in the Pacific and was responsible for providing an escort screen to the large Royal Navy carriers used in raids on the Japanese Home Islands.

With the surrender of the Japanese, she was present at the surrender ceremony on 27 August 1945 in Tokyo Bay.

Postwar service
Between 1946 and 1953, Teazer was held in reserve at Devonport. Between 1953 and 1954, she was converted into a Type 16 fast anti-submarine frigate, by Mountstuart Dry Docks, Cardiff, with the new pennant number F23 In January 1959, she replaced Grenville in the 2nd Training Squadron.

Decommissioning and disposal
Following decommissioning, Teazer was placed on the disposal list in September 1961. She was subsequently sold to Arnott Young, Dalmuir, for scrapping, arriving there on 7 August 1965.

In popular culture
In 1957, Teazer was used during the making of the film Yangtse Incident.

Doctor Who companion, Ben Jackson, was assigned to Teazer, as shown on his uniform cap. Within the "Whoniverse", Teazer was still in service in 1966. In July that year, she had recently left England, bound for the West Indies, leaving Jackson seconded to a shore posting and very disappointed.

References

Publications

External links
 Naval-History.net HMS Teazer
 Uboat.net HMS Teazer More detail than Naval History Net

 

S and T-class destroyers
Ships built on the River Mersey
1943 ships
World War II destroyers of the United Kingdom
Cold War destroyers of the United Kingdom
Type 16 frigates
Cold War frigates of the United Kingdom